Creative Time is a New York-based nonprofit arts organization. It was founded in 1974 to support the creation of innovative, site-specific, socially engaged artworks in the public realm, particularly in vacant spaces of historical and architectural interest.

History 
Creative Time came to life amidst the deterioration of New York City's infrastructure and social fabric, combined with the mission of the newly established National Endowment for the Arts to promote the role of artists in a democratic society and introduce new audiences to contemporary art. Artists in the late 1960s and early 70s were already experimenting with new media and new forms of art that could exist in the public sphere, outside the purview of conventional art galleries and museums.

Early Creative Time programs took over abandoned storefronts and neglected public spaces, such as the Brooklyn Bridge Anchorage and the Great Hall of the Chamber of Commerce in Lower Manhattan. Both landmarks had been unused for years before Creative Time reinvigorated them, through programs like Art in the Anchorage (1983–2001) and Projects at the Chamber (1982).

Creative Time initially gained widespread recognition for organizing ‘’Art on the Beach,’’ a project which brought together practitioners of many mediums and allowed for the creation of large-scale public works in Battery Park City between 1978 and 1985. For three months each summer ‘’Art on the Beach’’ offered site-specific sculpture and performances that were open to the public and free of cost.

Throughout ‘’Art on the Beach”, Creative Time was led by co-founder Anita Contini, who served as director until Cee Scott Brown took over in 1987. Anne Pasternak took the reins as director from 1993 to September 2015. Justine Ludwig currently serves as executive director. To this day, Creative Time continues to grow and prosper, each year giving both emerging and established artists unmatched opportunities to broaden their repertoires and explore the practice of art in the public realm. With these artists’ creations, Creative Time also allows millions of people of all ages and backgrounds to come in contact with contemporary art, enlivening the city around them. Since its founding, Creative Time has collaborated with over 2000 artists, producing more than 335 public art projects.

Reception and Notable Projects 
In recent years, Creative Time has taken charge of many noted initiatives in the art world. In collaboration with the Dallas art community, Creative Time took part in a yearlong study to better understand the strengths and areas of growth within the Dallas art scene. In this study, members of Creative Time met with various figures within the art community including artists, curators, philanthropists and collectors over the course of three week long visits to the city in 2010. Following these meetings, Creative Time produced a study detailing suggestions to help bolster the art scene in Dallas, identifying 13 key elements to help the community thrive listed as follows:

 A sustainable artist community and opportunities for live/work space
 Cultural institutions with international reach, innovative programs and historically relevant collections
 Great patrons who support the creation, presentation and acquisition of art
 Mid-sized and small art spaces that support the creation of new and experimental work by local and international artists
 Skilled and visionary arts leaders in institutions big and small
 Excellent contemporary art galleries with international reach
 Residency programs for national and international artists to create in Dallas
 Master of Fine Arts programs to train and attract artists
 Arts education in Dallas public schools
 Public art to engage broad audiences and activate public spaces
 Engaged audiences
 Experienced art writers featured daily in primary news media
 Civic championing of the arts through policies and urban planning.

Given the large number of Creative Time projects, it is impossible to exhaustively list the organization’s accomplishment, which range from art installations at the 2008 Art Basel in Miami to the opening of a gallery under the Brooklyn Bridge in 1983. The inclusion of these more specific examples is intended to illustrate Creative Time’s diverse role in the art world from the organizations founding in 1974 to present day.

The vast array of projects in recent years include skywriting over Manhattan in ‘’Clouds’’ (a 2001 collaboration with Vik Muniz), Tribute in Light (2002), and Kara Walker's A Subtlety (2014). Creative Time has also collaborated with such artists as Vito Acconci, Diller + Scofidio, David Byrne, Felix Gonzalez-Torres, Chrysanne Stathacos, Red Grooms, Jenny Holzer, Takashi Murakami, Shirin Neshat, Sonic Youth, Elizabeth Streb, Tania Bruguera, Temporary Services, Marc Horowitz and Superflex, among thousands more.

In addition to these artists, Creative Time often partners with other cultural institutions in New York City and elsewhere, like the Dia Art Foundation, the Queens Museum of Art, Lincoln Center, and the Metropolitan Museum of Art.

References 
Creative Time homepage
NYU's Fales Library and Special Collections Guide to the Creative Time Archive
“About Creative Time.” Creative Time, http://creativetime.org/about/.
Creative Time – Start a Movement – Meadows School of the Arts – SMU. https://www.smu.edu/Meadows/TheMovement/MeadowsPrize/2010-CreativeTime.
Creative Time Partners with Art Basel Miami Beach to Redesign Oceanfront. http://artdaily.com/news/33855/Creative-Time-Partners-with-Art-Basel-Miami-Beach-to-Redesign-Oceanfront.
Creative Time Releases Recommendations for Fostering the Arts in Dallas – SMU. https://www.smu.edu/News/2011/meadows-prize-report-01feb2011.
CREATIVE TIME SUMMIT SCREENING | The Cooper Union. https://cooper.edu/events-and-exhibitions/events/creative-time-summit-screening.
Glueck, Grace. “Art: Brooklyn Bridge Unveils Its Own Gallery.” The New York Times, 27 May 1983. NYTimes.com, https://www.nytimes.com/1983/05/27/arts/art-brooklyn-bridge-unveils-its-own-gallery.html.

External links
Creative Time homepage
 Creative Time at Google Cultural Institute
Creative Time LinkedIn Account Official LinkedIn Account for Creative Time.
Creative Time Archive at Fales Library and Special Collections at New York University Special Collections.

Further reading
 Pasternak, Anne and Ruth A. Peltason, ed. Creative Time : the book : 33 years of public art in New York City (New York : Princeton Architectural Press, 2007) ; 

Public art in New York City
Arts organizations based in New York City
Performance art in New York City
Arts organizations established in 1973
1973 establishments in New York City